Cerruti is a surname originating in Italy. It is derived from the Italian word "cero" or "cirro" both of which mean curl.

Variations
Spelling variations of the surname Cerruti include: Cerrati, Cerati, Cerrati, Cerruti, Cherty, Cherti, Ceruti, and many others..

Notable people
Aimée Cerruti (died 1920), Italian-born American actress
Carolina Cerruti (born 1962), Venezuelan model
Federico Cerruti (1922–2015), Italian art collector 
Felice Cerruti Bauduc (1817–1896), Italian painter 
Gabriela Cerruti (born 1965), Argentine journalist, writer, and politician
Linda Cerruti (born 1993), Italian swimmer
Máxima Cerruti (born 1971), Dutch Queen
Michela Cerruti (born 1987), Italian racing driver
Michelangelo Cerruti (1663–1748), Italian painter
Nino Cerruti (born 1930), Italian fashion designer

Ceruti 

Constanza Ceruti (born 1973), Argentine archaeologist
Enrico Ceruti (1806–1883), Italian violin maker 
Giacomo Ceruti (1698–1767), Italian Baroque painter
Giovanni Battista Ceruti (1756–1817), Italian violin maker
Mauro Ceruti (born 1953), Italian philosopher
Roberto Ceruti (born 1953), Italian cyclist
Roque Ceruti (c. 1683–1760), Italian composer

See also
Cerutti
Cerruti 1881, a French fashion house
Cerutti Mastodon site

Italian-language surnames